Orna Ross is the pen name of Aine McCarthy, born 1960. She is an Irish author, former literary agent, blogger and an advocate for creativism. She is the founder of the Alliance for Independent Authors, a professional association for authors who self-publish their work, and has been named one of the top 100 most influential people in publishing by The Bookseller, the UK publishing trade magazine.

Early life
Ross was born in Waterford, Ireland and was raised in Murrintown, County Wexford. She attended Murrintown National School and the Loreto Convent Wexford. She completed two degrees at the University College Dublin, including a Bachelor's degree in English Literature and a Master’s Degree in Women’s Studies. She also worked for some years as a lecturer in culture and creativity studies at UCD, teaching a groundbreaking Creative & Imaginative Practice course that forms the basis of her Go Creative! book series.

She is related to author and historian Nicholas Furlong as well as director of Tandem Press Paula Panczenko.

Career

Writing career
Ross published her first two books, A Lover’s Hollow and A Dance in Time, with Penguin Books. In 2012 she self-published the first two books in a forthcoming trilogy, The Irish Trilogy I: After the Rising and The Irish Trilogy II: Before the Fall, She has since gone on to self-publish her next two works of fiction, Blue Mercy and The Secret Rose, a tribute to W.B. Yeats.

In 2015, Ross contributed a volume to Outside the Box: Women Writing Women. She collaborated on the box set of novels with six other female writers. Ross’ works of fiction are often set in her home country of Ireland, family drama sagas that have been lauded by the Sunday Independent, Irish Times, RTÉ Guide and many other review outlets .

Alliance of Independent Authors
Ross believes strongly in the benefits of self-publishing for authors both established and just starting out in their careers. In 2012, she launched the Alliance of Independent Authors (ALLi), a not for profit organization that aims to protect the rights of writers and promote self-published books.

In her capacity as the head of ALLi she has advised the BBC on publishing costs for an independent author. In 2014, she was referred to by The Guardian as an "indie star" of the writing world, and featured on the Guardian Books Podcast.

Works and appearances

Fiction
Lovers’ Hollow, Penguin, 2005
A Dance in Time, Penguin, 2008
After the Rising,Orna Ross, 2012
Before the Fall, Orna Ross, 2012
Blue Mercy, Orna Ross, 2013
Outside the Box: Women Writing Women, Orna Ross and Joni Rodgers, 2015

Poetry
Ten Thoughts About Love, Orna Ross, 2011
Ten More Thoughts About Love, Orna Ross, 2013
Ten More Thoughts About Love 2, Orna Ross, 2013
Poetry for Christmas: Twelve Inspirational Poems for the Holiday Season, Orna Ross, 2013

Non-fiction
F-R-E-E Writing Notebook: A Go! Creative Tool. OrnaRoss, 2013
Opening Up To Indie Authors: A Guide for Bookstores, Libraries, Reviewers, Literary Event Organisers ... and Self-Publishing Writers, Alliance for Independent Authors, 2013 (with Dan Holloway and Debbie Young)
Choosing A Self Publishing Service 2014: The Alliance of Independent Authors Guide. Alliance for Independent Authors, 2014 (with Mick Rooney and GiacomoGiammatteo)
A Compendium For Creativists: How To Apply Creative Principles to Life: An Anthology, Orna Ross, 2015

Podcast appearances
Guardian Books Podcast (9 May 2014): Indie stars Hugh Howey, Orna Ross and Catherine Quinn explore how self-publishing is changing the literary landscape (Podcast)
T E Shepherd (2014): (Orna Ross talks about self-publishing on BBC R4 PM. BBC Radio 4 (Podcast)
Creative Penn by Joanna Penn (2014): Creating Money, Creating Meaning. Getting Into Financial Flow With Orna Ross

Personal life
McCarthy has been married for over thirty years, and has two children named Ornagh and Ross (whose names she combines to use as her pen name). She currently lives and writes in London. In 2008, she revealed her breast cancer diagnosis.

References

External links
 Official Web Page of Orna Ross 
 
 

Living people
People from County Waterford
21st-century Irish novelists
Irish women poets
Irish poets
Alumni of University College Dublin
Irish non-fiction writers
Irish women non-fiction writers
21st-century Irish women writers
20th-century Irish women writers
People from County Dublin
1960 births